Milovanov or Milovanova (feminine), sometimes spelled Mylovanov/Mylovanova, is a Slavic last name derived from the male given name Milovan (a Slavic name derived from the passive adjective milovati ("caress")).

The following people share this last name:
Bohdan Milovanov (born 1998), Ukrainian football player
Fyodor Milovanov (born 1979), Russian football player
Ivan Milovanov (born 1989), Russian futsal player
Sima Milovanov (1923–2002), Serbian football player and manager
Tymofiy Mylovanov (born 1975), Ukrainian economist

See also 
 Milovan
 Milovanović

Slavic-language surnames